Maximianus (? – 12 April 434) was the archbishop of Constantinople from 25 October 431 until his death on 12 April 434.

Biography
Maximianus was born in Rome from wealthy and pious parents. He had led a monastic life and had entered presbyteral orders; his action in building, at his own expense, tombs for the remains of holy men had obtained for him a reputation of sanctity. Sisinnius of Constantinople ordained him presbyter.

The action of the First Council of Ephesus had thrown the churches of Constantinople into direst confusion. A large proportion of the citizens held strongly to Nestorius; the clergy, with one voice, agreed in the anathema. When the deposition became a fact no longer to be disputed, the excitement was continued about the election of a successor. After four months, agreement was arrived at in the election of Maximian.

In principles he followed the former archbishops, Chrysostom, Atticus, and Sisinnius. Pope Celestine I wrote to him in highly complimentary terms on his elevation. The appointment was made by the unanimous vote of clergy, emperor, and people. The letter of Maximian announcing to the pope his succession is lost, but that to Saint Cyril of Alexandria remains, with its high eulogium on Cyril's constancy in defending the cause of Jesus.

It was the custom for occupants of the principal sees on election to send a synodical letter to the most considerable bishops of the Christian world, asking for the assurance of their communion. Maximian sent his synodical to the Easterns as to the others. Communion was refused by bishop Helladius of Tarsus; and, we may conclude, by Eutherius of Tyana, Himerius of Nicomedia, and Dorotheus of Martianopolis, as Maximian deposed them. Patriarch John of Antioch approved the refusal of the bishop of Tarsus, and praised him for having declined to insert the name of Maximian in the diptychs of his church.

Maximian's earnest appeal for reunion continued. Pope Sixtus III wrote to him several times, urging him to extend his charity to all whom he could possibly regain. Maximian spared no effort, and although he was in closest harmony with Saint Cyril, he pressed him strongly to give up his anathemas, which seemed an insurmountable obstacle to reunion. He even wrote to the emperor's secretary Aristolaus the tribune, who was greatly interested in the question of peace, almost complaining that he did not press Cyril enough on the point, and to his archdeacon Epiphanius.

Harmony being restored, John of Antioch and the other Eastern bishops wrote Maximian a letter of communion indicating their consent to his election and to the deposition of Nestorius. Cyril wrote to him, attributing the blessed result to the force of his prayers. A letter to Maximian from Aristolaus, which Maximian caused to be read in his church to his people, was pronounced spurious by Dorotheus of Martianopolis, evidently because it took the side of Maximian so decidedly.

Maximianus died in office. Of all his letters, only that to Saint Cyril is extant.

References

Attribution
  Sinclair cites:
Baluz. Nov. Coll. Conc. 581 seq. ed. 1681;
Liberat. Diac. Brev. 19; Ceill. viii.394.
J. D. Mansi, v.257, 259, 266, 269, 271, 273, 286, 351;
Socr. vii.35.40;

434 deaths
Maximianus
Ancient Christians involved in controversies
Year of birth unknown
Nestorianism